Jennifer Gilbert (born December 24, 1968) is an American entrepreneur and TV personality. She is the founder and chief visionary officer of Save the Date, a New York–based special events planning company. She was named one of the Entrepreneurs of the Year by Ernst & Young for her company in 1998.

Gilbert is often recognized for her role on Bravo's Real Housewives of New York City and most notably her published memoir, I Never Promised You a Goodie Bag, published by Harper Collins.

Early life and career
Gilbert graduated from the University of Vermont in 1990 and received a Bachelor of Science in Consumer Marketing with a minor in Business. She attended MIT for a fellowship program called The Birthing of Giants. After graduation, Gilbert moved to New York City. In 1991, at the age of 22, a stranger attacked her, stabbing her 37 times with a screwdriver before leaving her for dead.

After recovering, she decided to become an event planner and started Save the Date in 1994. The company has rendered services to many notable clients including several in Fortune 500 companies and has been retained by customers such as Bill and Melinda Gates Foundation, Oprah Winfrey and thesinger Jewel.

In 1998, she was awarded the "Entrepreneur of the Year" award for "Save the Date" by Ernst & Young. Her business savvy, flipping the business model of her competitors and becoming the first marketplace for clients and venues to find each other revolutionized the industry. Her work on "all things events" has been featured in national outlets such as Forbes, Huffington Post, The New York Times, and monthly publications like Marie Claire.

Gilbert is a sought-after public speaker for discussions on entrepreneurship, the hospitality and events industry, and for women-owned businesses. In 2010, she presented the keynote on "Making It in Events: The View From Here!" at BizBash, an event Expo. In 2013, she delivered a TEDx talk on the "Entrepreneurial Spirit" at TEDxBarnardCollege. She is a founding member of the Forbes Impact Summit.

I Never Promised You A Goodie Bag, her authored memoir, was published by Harper Collins in 2012. In her book, she discussed about how her life changed after being attacked at a young age and then how she took control of her life and started a successful company. She spoke at TEDx Barnard College Women sharing her entrepreneurial spirit and philosophy.

TV appearances
She appeared as herself in the Bravo's hit TV series Real Housewives of New York City in 2010. She was the party planner for Jill Zarin.

Personal life
Gilbert lives in New York City with her three children. Gilbert is known for promoting the advancement of women in the workforce. She has sat on the board of the Network For Teaching Entrepreneurship (NFTE).

References

External links
 

1968 births
Living people
Event planners
University of Vermont alumni
The Real Housewives of New York City